Viral Scandal is a Philippine television drama broadcast by Kapamilya Channel, A2Z and TV5. It aired from November 15, 2021 to May 13, 2022 on the channel's Primetime Bida evening block and worldwide via The Filipino Channel, replacing Huwag Kang Mangamba.

Series overview

 iWantTFC shows two episodes first in advance before its television broadcast.

Episodes

Season 1

Season 2

References

Lists of Philippine drama television series episodes